Pachepelda is a rural locality (a village) in Chekuyevskoye Rural Settlement of Onezhsky District, Arkhangelsk Oblast, Russia. The population was 10 as of 2010.

Geography 
Pachepelda is located on the Onega River, 101 km southeast of Onega (the district's administrative centre) by road. Kaska is the nearest rural locality.

References 

Rural localities in Onezhsky District